Çılbır is a Turkish dish of poached eggs with yogurt (often with garlic mixed in).

There are records of çılbır being eaten by Ottoman sultans as far back as the 15th century. It is now common to serve the dish topped with melted butter infused with Aleppo pepper, for which paprika can be substituted.

In several Balkan countries such as Bosnia and Herzegovina, Montenegro  and Serbia, the Turkish word çılbır is rendered as čimbur and refers to a fried eggs dish. Almost identical is the Panagyurski style eggs dish in Bulgaria.

See also
 List of egg dishes
 Turkish cuisine

References

External links

Egg dishes
Turkish cuisine
Bulgarian cuisine
Turkish words and phrases
Yogurt-based dishes